The 2011 Sydney Roosters season was the 104th in the club's history. Coached by Brian Smith and captained by Braith Anasta, they competed in the NRL's 2011 Telstra Premiership . However, the Roosters finished 11th (out of 16), failing to reach the finals.

Player Summary

References

Sydney Roosters seasons
Sydney Roosters season